Shorea splendida is a species of plant in the family Dipterocarpaceae. It is a tree endemic to Borneo. It is threatened by habitat loss.

References

splendida
Endemic flora of Borneo
Trees of Borneo
Taxonomy articles created by Polbot